Unedogemmula annae is an extinct species of sea snail, a marine gastropod mollusk in the family Turridae, the turrids.

Description
The length of the shell attains 8 mm.

Distribution
This extinct marine species was found in Miocene strata in Hungary.

References

 Kovács, Zoltán, and Zoltán Vicián. "Middle Miocene Conoidea (Neogastropoda) assemblage of Letkés (Hungary), Part II.(Borsoniidae, Cochlespiridae, Clavatulidae, Turridae, Fusiturridae)." Földtani Közlöny 151.2 (2021): 137-137.

annae
Gastropods described in 1891